Mike Hall (born 4 January 1970) is a Canadian speed skater. He competed in the men's 5000 metres event at the 1994 Winter Olympics.

References

External links
 

1970 births
Living people
Canadian male speed skaters
Olympic speed skaters of Canada
Speed skaters at the 1994 Winter Olympics
Sportspeople from Saskatchewan
20th-century Canadian people